The Chicago, St. Paul, Minneapolis and Omaha Railway or Omaha Road  was a railroad in the U.S. states of Nebraska, Iowa, Minnesota, Wisconsin and South Dakota. It was incorporated in 1880 as a consolidation of the Chicago, St. Paul and Minneapolis Railway and the North Wisconsin Railway. The Chicago and North Western Railway (C&NW) gained control in 1882. The C&NW leased the Omaha Road in 1957 and merged the company into itself in 1972. Portions of the C. St. P. M. and O. are part of the Union Pacific Railroad network. This includes main lines from Wyeville, Wisconsin, to St. Paul, Minnesota, and St. Paul to Sioux City, Iowa.

History

St. Paul to Elroy (Eastern Division)
The West Wisconsin Railway was authorized in 1876 to build from St. Paul, Minnesota through to reach the Chicago and Northwestern Railroad at Elroy, Wisconsin. In 1878 the bankrupt West Wisconsin Railway was acquired by the Chicago, St. Paul and Minneapolis Railway. This main line from the junction with the Great Northern at St. Paul to Elroy, along with branches from it became known as the Eastern Division.

St. Paul to Sioux City (Western Division)
The Land Grant Act of Congress approved March 3, 1857, when Minnesota was still a Territory and not a state, conferred on the then called Southern Minnesota Railroad Company "lands, interests, rights, powers and privileges" for the proposed line of railroad from St. Paul via Mankato, Minnesota and other points named to the southern boundary of the state in the direction of the mouth of the Big Sioux river. The Minnesota Valley Railroad Company was organized in 1864 under an act of the Minnesota Legislature approved March 4, 1864. This granted to the new company the Southern Minnesota Railroad grant.

In 1869 the Minnesota Valley Railroad constructed a bridge jointly with the Minnesota Central Railroad Company to cross the Mississippi between Mendota and St. Paul at Pickerel Lake. It was the predecessor of the current Omaha Road Bridge Number 15 at the same location. A freight house was constructed in St. Paul at the foot of Robert Street. The name of the company changed on April 7, 1869, to the St. Paul and Sioux City Railroad The railroad had reached Mankato at the bend of the Minnesota river, and exited the river valley to reach Lake Crystal, Minnesota. By September 1872, the track was completed to Le Mars, Iowa, where it joined the Iowa Falls and Sioux City railroad, a predecessor of the Illinois Central Railroad. On October 1, 1872, the railroad was in regular operation from St. Paul through to Sioux City. This main line from Mendota to Le Mars became the St. Paul & Sioux City division, and eventually the Western Division.

Creation
The North Wisconsin Railway was merged along with Chicago, St. Paul and Minneapolis Railway to become the Chicago, St. Paul, Minneapolis and Omaha Railway in 1880.
 The C. St. P. M. & O. then purchased the St. Paul and Sioux City in 1881. The route was a bow shape between Le Mars, Iowa, to the Twin Cities, to Elroy, Wisconsin. The railroad connected the Eastern and Western divisions through trackage leases on the Minneapolis and St. Louis at Merriam Junction to Minneapolis, the Great Northern between Minneapolis and St. Paul, and the Milwaukee Road between Mendota and St. Paul. 

The Omaha would go on to acquire the Menomonie Railway, the Sault Ste Marie and Southwestern Railway, the Superior Short Line Railway, the Watonwan Valley Railway, the Des Moines Valley Railway, the Chippewa Valley and Northwestern Railway, and Eau Claire, Chippewa Falls, and Northeastern Railway.

Chicago and North Western
In November 1883, control passed to the Chicago and North Western Railway Company. At the end of 1956 C. St. P. M. & O. operated 1616 miles of road and 2396 miles of track; that year it reported 2115 million ton-miles of revenue freight and 65 million passenger-miles.

Union Pacific
Although the CMO had long been absorbed by the C&NW before that railroad was purchased by the Union Pacific, the UP still uses the CMO reporting mark on cars.

Disposition of lines

The following main lines were part of the Omaha Road:

References

Former Class I railroads in the United States
Predecessors of the Chicago and North Western Transportation Company
Defunct Iowa railroads
Defunct Minnesota railroads
Defunct Nebraska railroads
Defunct South Dakota railroads
Defunct Wisconsin railroads
Railway companies established in 1880
Railway companies disestablished in 1972
American companies established in 1880